Hyakutake may refer to:

Astronomy
 Comet Hyakutake, a comet discovered in 1996

People

 Gengo Hyakutake (1882–1976), Imperial Japanese Navy admiral
 Harukichi Hyakutake (1888–1947), Imperial Japanese Army general
 Saburō Hyakutake (1872–1963), Imperial Japanese Navy admiral
 Tetsugo Hyakutake (b. 1975), Japanese artist and photographer
 Yoshinari Hyakutake,(b. 1977), Japanese football player
 Yuji Hyakutake (1950–2002), Japanese astronomer